The Dinaric Mountains mixed forests are a terrestrial ecoregion of the temperate broadleaf and mixed forests biome in Southeastern Europe, according to both the WWF and Digital Map of European Ecological Regions by the European Environment Agency. It also is in the Palearctic realm.

Geography
The Dinaric Mountains mixed forests compose the montane forest region of the Dinaric Alps. This mountain range stretches along the eastern coast of the Adriatic Sea and occupy 58,200 km² (22,500 mi²) in Slovenia, Croatia, Bosnia and Herzegovina, Montenegro, Serbia, northeastern Kosovo, northern Albania, and northeastern Italy.

With high precipitation ranges and an abundance of limestones, karst relief is prominent.

Climate
The climate of the ecoregion is wet and extremely humid. Precipitation ranges are generally above 1500 mm and ranges between 2000 and 3500 mm are common. Maximums measured in the hinterland of the Bay of Kotor surpass annual averages beyond 4500 mm (Crkvice), the highest precipitation ranges in Europe and one of the highest of the Northern Hemisphere. It is part of Köppen's temperate type with humid summers (Cfs) and mountain snow climates (Dfs). Due to snow abundance and avalanching, alpine biotopes are common for all high mountains. Several small glaciers still persist in the Durmitor and Accursed Mountains ranges, the Dinaric Alps' highest massifs.

Flora
The wide altitudinal range of this ecoregion hosts a range of plant communities. The highest elevations (above 1,500 m) are covered with conifer forests, with a mixed broadleaf vegetation and occurring at lower elevations. 

The conifer zone is dominated by the Norway spruce, silver fir, European black pine, and bosnian pine with an admixture of European beech. Dinaric calcareous block fir forest grows on limestone outcrops. The dominant species of the lower zones include various deciduous oaks (Quercus frainetto, Q. pubescens, Q. cerris, Quercus robur and Quercus petraea) and the oriental hornbeam (Carpinus orientalis). The South European flowering ash (Fraxinus ornus) marks the submediterranean zone at region below 600–1000 m (from N to S). 

Phytogeographically, the ecoregion is shared between the Adriatic and East Mediterranean provinces of the Mediterranean Region, within the Holarctic Kingdom (according to Armen Takhtajan's delineation).

Protected areas
35,989 km², or 5%, of the ecoregion is in protected areas. Another 1% of the ecoregion's area has relatively intact but unprotected forests.

Protected areas in the ecoregion include Triglav National Park in Slovenia, Plitvice Lakes National Park in Croatia, Biogradska Gora, Durmitor, and Accursed Mountains national parks in Montenegro, and Valbonë Valley National Park in Albania.

External links

References

 
Dinaric Alps
Ecoregions of Albania
Ecoregions of Bosnia and Herzegovina
Ecoregions of Croatia
Ecoregions of Europe
Ecoregions of Italy
Ecoregions of Montenegro
Ecoregions of Serbia
Ecoregions of Slovenia
Environment of the Balkans
Ecoregions of the Mediterranean Basin

Montane forests
Palearctic ecoregions
Temperate broadleaf and mixed forests